The 1991–92 season in Japanese football was the last of the old Japan Soccer League before the transition period into the J.League.

League tables

First Division

Second Division

Successor seasons
1992 Japan Football League
1993 J.League

References

Japan Soccer League seasons
1991 in Japanese football
1992 in Japanese football leagues
Japan Soccer League